Joseph Hudson may refer to:
Joseph Hudson (inventor) (1848–1930), inventor of the police whistle and referee whistle
Joseph Hudson (tobacconist) (1778–1854), tobacconist to the British royal family
Joseph Lowthian Hudson (1846–1912), founder of Hudson's department store
Joseph Hadley Hudson (1977–2021), American professional wrestler, best known as Jocephus and Question Mark in National Wrestling Alliance
Joseph Kennedy Hudson (1840–1907), general during the American Civil War and Spanish–American War, founder of the Topeka Daily Capital
Joseph Neal Hudson (born 1982), US Army Spc. captured with American POWs in the 2003 invasion of Iraq

See also
Joe Hudson (disambiguation)